Luis Felipe Ramón y Rivera (August 23, 1913 - October 22, 1993)  was a Venezuelan musician, composer and writer. Director of several orchestras and the founder of The National Typical Orchestra, he was also for twenty years the director of the National Institute of Folklore. He founded the International Foundation of Ethnomusicology and Folklore (now Centro de La Diversidad Cultural) in 1988 and donated the bulk of his estate to it when he died. He authored more than 20 works of Venezuelan folklore.

Sources 
Luis Felipe Ramón y Rivera Biography

See also 
Music of Venezuela

1913 births
1993 deaths
Folklorists
People from San Cristóbal, Táchira
Venezuelan composers
Male composers
Venezuelan male poets
20th-century Venezuelan poets
20th-century composers
20th-century male writers
20th-century male musicians